These awards were created to celebrate design excellence in Kent and were first staged in 2003 and are usually held every two years. They were then renamed 'Kent Design and Development Awards' in 2012. Then have stayed as the 'Kent Design and Development Awards' in 2014.

2003

 Commercial and Industrial Building winner - Holiday Extras HQ Building, Newingreen, Hythe
 Public Building winner - Riverhead Infant School, Sevenoaks
 Urban Design and Town Centre Renewal winner - St. Mildreds Lavender Mews, Canterbury 
 Best Individual House - Lynwood, Tunbridge Wells (private residence)
 Housebuilding for Quality winner - Ingress Park, Greenhithe
 Overall winner - Lynwood, Tunbridge Wells (private residence)

Highly Commended was Romney Warren Visitor Centre

2004
 Housebuilding for Quality winner - Vista (private residence), Dungeness
 Public Building/Education winner - St Augustine's RC School, Hythe
 Town and Village Renaissance - Horsebridge and Brownings Yard, Whitstable
 Overall Winner - St Augustine's RC School, Hythe

2005/2006
 Public Building winner - Trosley Country Park amenity block 
 Commercial, Industrial and retail winner - Kings Hill Village Centre 
 Housebuilding winner - Iden Farm Cottage, Boughton Monchelsea, near Maidstone
 Building Renovation winner - The Old Gymnasium, Deal Cavalry Barracks, Deal 
 Best New Neighbourhood winner - Affordable village housing in Ash Grove, St Margaret's at Cliffe, near Dover.
 Overall Winner - The Goods Shed, Canterbury

2007/2008 
Also nominated was Sevenoaks Kaleidoscope museum, library and gallery, although misleadingly named as a winner on an architects brochure.

 Commercial, Industrial and retail winner - Broadside (HQ of MHS Homes), Chatham 
 Housebuilding winner - Sandling Park (a residential scheme), Maidstone
 Building Renovation (joint winners) - Pilkington Building  and Drill Hall Library, within the Universities at Medway
 Public Building winner - Parrock Street public toilets, Gravesend (Gravesham Community Project PFI)
 Landscape category winner - Lower Leas Coastal Park, Folkestone
 Overall Winner - The Pines Calyx, St Margaret's at Cliffe

2010
30 projects were shortlisted in seven categories from more than 60 entries. 
The Medway Building at the University of Kent as part of the Universities at Medway, was nominated for Best Public Building. Also nominated was Crossway Low Energy House, near Maidstone.

 Conservation & Craftsmanship Category winner - The Darnley Mausoleum, Cobham
 Town & Village Renaissance winner - Ashford Shared Space
 Residential overall winner - The Quays (towers with the former Chatham Dockyard), Chatham Maritime
 Residential (major development) winner - The Quays, Chatham Maritime
 Residential (minor development) winner - El Ray, Dungeness
 Commercial, Industrial & Retail winner - Deal Pier
 Public Buildings (general) winner - Quarterhouse, Folkestone
 Public Buildings (schools) winner - St. James the Great Primary & Nursery School, East Malling
 Project of the Year - the Lord Sandy Bruce-Lockhart Award - The Darnley Mausoleum, Cobham

2012 (Renamed as 'Kent Design and Development Awards')
Jointly organised and sponsored by 'DHA Planning' (town planning and transport consultancy), Kent County Council and Ward Homes (public housing management).

94 nominees including Sevenoaks School Performing Arts Centre and Cornwallis Academy.

 Commercial, Industrial and Retail winner - Rocksalt Restaurant, Folkestone
 Public Buildings Education winner - Marlowe Theatre, Canterbury 
 Civils and Infrastructure winner - Dover Esplande, sea frontage 
 Environmental Performance winner - Hadlow College 
 Minor Residential winner - Hill House, Ulcombe
 Major Residential winner - Rosemary Gardens, Park Wood
 Public Buildings, Community winner - Turner Contemporary 
 Public Buildings, Education winner - Walderslade Primary School 
 Project of the Year (Sponsored by DHA Planning) - Rocksalt Restaurant, Folkestone

2014 Kent Design and Development Awards
The shortlist was announced in September 2014;
Categories Include:
 Major Residential category - Horsted Park, Chatham
 Minor Residential category - Pobble House, Romney Marsh
 Commercial, Industrial and Retail category - Medway Crematorium
 Civils and Infrastructure category - Sandwich Town Tidal Defences
 Education Public Buildings category - Goat Lees Primary School, Ashford
 Community Public Buildings category - Cyclopark, Gravesend
 Environmental Performance category - Goat Lees Primary School, Ashford

Overall winner ‘Project of the year’ - Goat Lees Primary School, Ashford,

2016 Awards
Twenty-three developments were shortlisted for the eight categories;
Winners:
 Commercial, Industrial and Retail category - The Wing, Capel-le-Ferne
 Conservation category - Command of the Oceans at Chatham Historic Dockyard,
 Environmental Performance category - North Vat, a house near Dungeness,
 Infrastructure and Renewables category - the cut and cover tunnel at Hermitage Quarry, Barming, by Gallagher Ltd,
 Education Public Buildings category - The Yarrow in Broadstairs,
 Community Public Buildings category - Fairfield (part of East Kent College) in Dartford
 Minor Residential category - Nautical Mews in Margate, 
 Major Residential category - Farrow Court in Ashford and Wallis Fields in Maidstone,

The Wing for the Battle of Britain Memorial Trust at Capel-le-Ferne was named Project of the Year.

References

External links
Kent Design and Development Awards 2012 

Design awards
Architecture awards
Architecture in the United Kingdom
British awards
Awards established in 2000
Kent